The Boeri River is a river in Dominica. It rises on the western slopes of Morne Trois Pitons, flowing south and then west to reach the Caribbean Sea on the country's southwestern coast, to the north of the capital, Roseau.

Rivers of Dominica